The 2021–22 Longwood Lancers men's basketball team represented Longwood University in the 2021–22 NCAA Division I men's basketball season. The Lancers, led by fourth-year head coach Griff Aldrich, played their home games at Willett Hall in Farmville, Virginia as members of the Big South Conference. With the reintroduction of divisions for the first time since the 2013–14 season, the Lancers played in the North division. They finished the regular season 26–6, 15–1 in Big South play to win the Big South regular season championship. They defeated North Carolina A&T, USC Upstate, and Winthrop to win the Big South tournament championship. As a result, the Lancers received the conference's automatic bid to the NCAA tournament, the school's first-ever trip to the tournament, as the No. 14 seed in the South Region, where they lost in the first round to Tennessee.

Previous season
In a season limited due to the ongoing COVID-19 pandemic, the Lancers finished the 2020–21 season 12–17, 10–10 in Big South play to finish in a three-way tie for fifth place. They defeated UNC Asheville in the quarterfinals of the Big South tournament, before falling to top-seeded Winthrop in the semifinals. They received an invitation to the College Basketball Invitational tournament, where they lost to Pepperdine in the quarterfinals.

Roster

Schedule and results

|-
!colspan=12 style=| Non-conference regular season

|-
!colspan=12 style=| Big South regular season

|-
!colspan=9 style=| Big South tournament

|-
!colspan=9 style=| NCAA tournament

Source

References

Longwood Lancers men's basketball seasons
Longwood Lancers
Longwood Lancers men's basketball
Longwood Lancers men's basketball
Longwood